François Rabelais (c. 1494 – 1553) was a French Renaissance writer, doctor, and humanist.

Rabelais may also refer to:
5666 Rabelais, a main-belt asteroid
François Rabelais University, a public university in Tours, France
Rabelais Student Media, a student newspaper at La Trobe University, Melbourne, Australia

People with the surname
Akira Rabelais (born 1966), U.S. composer and author 
Jacques Rabelais (c. 1547 – 1622), French Renaissance writer and scholar